BIF or bif may refer to:

Organisations 
 Benevolence International Foundation, part of al-Qaeda, posing as a charity
 Brabrand IF, football club playing in the Danish 2nd Division
 Brøndby IF, football club playing in the Danish Superliga
 Brynäs IF, ice hockey team from Gävle, Sweden
 Die BIF, one of the first lesbian magazines

Places 
 Barrow-in-Furness railway station, station code BIF
 British Industries Fair, Birmingham, England

Science and technology 
 Banded iron formation, a type of rock
 Bifrenaria, orchid genus
 Borderline intellectual functioning

Other uses 
 Bif Naked, Canadian musician
 Bipartisan Infrastructure Framework, H.R. 3684, in relation to the 2021 U.S. infrastructure spending plan
 Burundian franc, by ISO 4217 code